Femundsmarka National Park is a national park in Innlandet and Trøndelag counties in Norway.  The landscape is largely marshes and lakes (it lies adjacent to Norway's second largest natural lake, Femunden).  It is a popular destination for canoeing and fishing.  The park was formed in 1971 to protect the lake and the forests stretching eastwards to Sweden. Indeed, the landscapes here are more Swedish in appearance than recognisably Norwegian. The forest is sparse and consists of craggy pine and birch.

The park has long been a source of falcons for use in the European and Asian sport of falconry and several places in the park are known as Falkfangerhøgda, or "falcon hunters' height".  There are also wild reindeer grazing in the heights and, in summer, a herd of around 30 musk oxen roam the area along the Røa and Mugga Rivers (in winter they migrate to the Funäsdalen area). This group split off from an older herd in the Dovrefjell area and migrated here.

The National Park influenced the name of the album Femundsmarka of the German black metal band Waldgeflüster.

Name
The first element is the genitive of the lake name Femund and the last element is the finite form of mark which means "woodland" or "forest".

References

External links
 National Parks of Norway - Femundsmarka
 Official website - Femundsmarka National Park

National parks of Norway
Protected areas established in 1971
Protected areas of Hedmark
Protected areas of Trøndelag
Tourist attractions in Hedmark
Tourist attractions in Trøndelag
Røros
1971 establishments in Norway
Engerdal